Fragum nivale is a species of cockle in the family Cardiidae, that lives in the Western Indian Ocean, in benthic environments. It has a body length of 1.2 cm, and the embryos are developed into a swimming trocophore larvae, that resemble an immature clam.

References

Bivalves described in 1845
Cardiidae

Molluscs of the Indian Ocean